In number theory, the multiplicative digital root of a natural number  in a given number base  is found by multiplying the digits of  together, then repeating this operation until only a single-digit remains, which is called the multiplicative digital root of . 
The multiplicative digital root for the first few positive integers are:
0, 1, 2, 3, 4, 5, 6, 7, 8, 9, 0, 1, 2, 3, 4, 5, 6, 7, 8, 9, 0, 2, 4, 6, 8, 0, 2, 4, 6, 8, 0, 3, 6, 9, 2, 5, 8, 2, 8, 4, 0.  
Multiplicative digital roots are the multiplicative equivalent of digital roots.

Definition 
Let  be a natural number. We define the digit product for base   to be the following:

where  is the number of digits in the number in base , and
 
is the value of each digit of the number.

For example, in base , 0 is the multiplicative digital root of 9876, as 
 
 
 

This is because if , then

and therefore

If , then trivially 

Multiplicative persistence
The multiplicative persistence is undefined if it never reaches a fixed point.

In base 10, it is conjectured that there is no number with a multiplicative persistence : this is known to be true for numbers . The smallest numbers with persistence 0, 1, ... are:
0, 10, 25, 39, 77, 679, 6788, 68889, 2677889, 26888999, 3778888999, 277777788888899. 

The search for these numbers can be sped up by using additional properties of the decimal digits of these record-breaking numbers. These digits must be sorted, and, except for the first two digits, all digits must be 7, 8, or 9. There are also additional restrictions on the first two digits.
However, any number that is missing from the sequence above would have multiplicative persistence > 11; such numbers are believed not to exist, and would need to have over 20,000 digits if they do exist.

Extension to negative integers
The multiplicative digital root can be extended to the negative integers by use of a signed-digit representation to represent each integer.

Programming example
The example below implements the digit product described in the definition above to search for multiplicative digital roots and multiplicative persistences in Python.
def digit_product(x: int, b: int) -> int:
    if x == 0:
        return 0
    total = 1
    while x > 1:
        if x % b == 0:
            return 0
        if x % b > 1:
            total = total * (x % b)
        x = x // b
    return total

def multiplicative_digital_root(x: int, b :int) -> int:
    seen = []
    while x not in seen:
        seen.append(x)
        x = digit_product(x, b)
    return x

def multiplicative_persistence(x: int, b: int) -> int:
    seen = []
    while x not in seen:
        seen.append(x)
        x = digit_product(x, b)
    return len(seen) - 1

See also
 Arithmetic dynamics
 Digit sum
 Digital root
 Sum-product number

References

Literature

External links 
  (Mar 21, 2019)

Algebra
Arithmetic dynamics
Integer sequences
Base-dependent integer sequences
Number theory